Peter Adler Alberti (10 June 1851, in Copenhagen – 14 June 1932, in Copenhagen) was a Danish politician and swindler, known for the Alberti scandal of 1908.

Family life

On 6 October 1876 in the Church of Holmen the 25-year-old barrister (overretssagfører) Alberti married the five years younger Eugenia née Møller.

They divorced and on 14 June 1906 in the Church of Our Lady (Copenhagen) he married the eleven years younger Anna Victoria Bendix née Sundberg, residing at Ny Vestergade 17-2. They also divorced.

On 1 November 1906 Alberti moved from Ny Vestergade to Sankt Annæ Plads 9-1 where he resided until his arrest.

On 20 August 1917 after his release from the State Prison in Vridsløselille he moved to Fælledvej 10 on Nørrebro.

Six months later he moved to Gammel Kongevej 141-2 and in 1921 he resided there as a lodger with a small family, where the daughter was a clerk in the ministry of Finance.

Alberti notarised a will on 1 December 1925.

In 1929 he resided again at Fælledvej 10-1, the following year he resided there as a lodger sharing the apartment with four working class women.

On 14 June 1932 while residing on the same address, Alberti died on Rigshospitalet's dept. C due to a traffic accident.

On 20 June 1932 he was buried in Assistens Cemetery (Copenhagen).

Career

Alberti was a solicitor, the son of a well-respected liberal politician who had been a pioneer of the Danish savings bank system. This family background lead to his own career as the leader of Den sjællandske Bondestands Sparekasse from 1890 but very early he was also involved in speculations and doubtful economic transactions partly due to his ludomania. Later on it has become clear that he had been guilty of severe embezzlement from a very early stage. Perhaps in order to neutralise further attacks he entered politics in 1892 representing the right wing of the liberal movement. However he joined the united Venstre Reform Party in 1895, making himself the right hand of J. C. Christensen.

From 1901 to 1908 Alberti was the first Venstre Minister of Juridical Affairs, in which post he showed himself to be an able and efficient politician although often authoritarian and brash. During this period he was subjected to harder and harder accusations of economic dishonesty by radicals and Social Democrats. Prime minister J. C. Christensen ignored the critics as long as possible but in the end had to ask Alberti to resign. A few months later, on 8 September 1908, Alberti turned himself in to the police for embezzlement of 18 million DKK (1.1 billion DKK as of 2013). He was sentenced to 8 years in 'Tugthus' (imprisonment at hard labor) and was imprisoned from 1912 to 1917. After his release he lived quietly as a clerk.

The affair was a scandal that echoed over all of Europe and also involved Alberti's British business partners. In Denmark it led to the fall of the Christensen cabinet and for some years it poisoned the political atmosphere in Denmark. It is therefore still considered one of the most serious swindles of modern Danish history.

References

 Dansk Biografisk Leksikon, vol. 1, Copenhagen, 1979.
 Svend Thorsen: De danske ministerier, vol. 2, Copenhagen, 1972.

1851 births
1932 deaths
20th-century Danish criminals
Danish male criminals
Danish Justice Ministers
Danish prisoners and detainees
Prisoners and detainees of Denmark
Venstre (Denmark) politicians
Politicians from Copenhagen
Politicians convicted of embezzlement
Members of the Folketing 1892–1895
Members of the Folketing 1895–1898
Members of the Folketing 1898–1901
Members of the Folketing 1901–1903
Members of the Folketing 1903–1906
Members of the Folketing 1906–1909
Ministers for Iceland